Bikram Assembly constituency is one of 243 representative districts of legislative assembly in the Indian state of Bihar. It is a part of Pataliputra Lok Sabha constituency along with other assembly constituencies viz. Danapur, Maner, Phulwari, Masaurhi and Paliganj.

Area/wards
Bikram Assembly constituency comprises Naubatpur CD block and Bikram CD block; Gram Panchayats: Koudiya, Bindaul, Kunjwa, Machchhalpur Lai, Saidabad, Wazirpur, Naghar, Yamunapur and Taranagar of Bihta CD block.

Members of Legislative Assembly

Election results

2020

2010

References

External links
 

Assembly constituencies in Patna district
Politics of Patna district
Assembly constituencies of Bihar